The Aachen Treaty, formally Treaty on Franco-German Cooperation and Integration, and also known as the Treaty of Aachen, is a bilateral agreement between the Federal Republic of Germany and the French Republic, which entered into force on 22 January 2020, a year after it was signed. It was signed by Federal Chancellor Angela Merkel and President Emmanuel Macron in the coronation hall of the Aachen City Hall on 22 January 2019.

History
The proposal for a renewal of the Élysée Treaty was first made by Emmanuel Macron on 26 September 2017 in his . At the 55th anniversary of the Élysée Treaty, both Macron and Angela Merkel again spoke out in favour of deepening the cooperation in business, society, politics and technology.

Besides Macron and Merkel the ceremony was also attended by other high-ranking politicians, f.e. Klaus Johannis (President of Romania, chairing the Council of the European Union in the first half of 2019), Jean-Claude Juncker (European Commission President), Donald Tusk (President of the European Council) and Armin Laschet (Minister President of North Rhine-Westphalia).

Contents
The Aachen Treaty consists of a total of 28 articles. The six main chapters of the treaty are labeled:

 European affairs
 Peace, security and development
 Culture, education, research and mobility
 Regional and transnational cooperation
 Sustainable development, climate, environment and economic affairs
 Organization

Among other topics the aim of the contract is to strengthen the cultural diversity (§9) as well as to align security interests of both countries. The Goethe-Institut and the Institut Français plan to jointly open cultural institutions in Erbil, Bishkek, Rio de Janeiro and Palermo on the basis of the Aachen Treaty.

In addition, the contract aims to intensify the cooperation of the defense politics of both countries, including the mutual assistance in potential crisis situations.

The treaty was a factor in the formation of the Franco-German Parliamentary Assembly.

Critique
Several criticisms have been heard since the creation of the Treaty:
Marine Le Pen's Rassemblement National party stated that the Aachen Treaty would give Alsace to Germany, and that France would share its seat in the UN Security Council with Germany. The claims were refuted by the Élysée Palace and by the newspapers Le Monde and La Croix.

See also 

 France–Germany relations
 Schuman Declaration
 History of Europe

References

Further reading
 
  (NB.

France–Germany relations
2019 in Germany
2019 in France
Treaties concluded in 2019
Treaties of France
Treaties of Germany
Emmanuel Macron
Angela Merkel
Treaties entered into force in 2020